The Changshu Institute of Technology (CIT) is a provincial public university, which is characterized by polytechnic, application technology and teacher education.
It is located in the center of the Yangtze Delta, in Changshu, a satellite city of Suzhou, Jiangsu, China. It is across a lake from Shajiabang. It is divided into the East Lake campus and the Southeast campus. It was grown out of Suzhou Normal College and was officially opened on 12 May 2004.

The school motto is "Breed integrity, seek truth—keep at it every day, and you'll go far along the way"..

History

The Changshu Institute of Technology was established in August 1958 and was originally known as Suzhou Normal Vocational College. It recruited teachers' college graduates in 1978 after the recovering of the institution of college entrance examination. In 1989, it joined Changshu Vocational University with the approval of the Jiangsu government and state education commission. CIT bid for undergraduate course in the early year 2002. In 2004, the Ministry of Education passed the bill to establish the Changshu Institute of Technology. The date of May 12 is known as the school day of CIT.

Specialties
CIT sets 7 main specialties and provides 44 programs, including 8 specialties in arts, 1 specialty in history, 2 specialties in education, 1 specialty in law, 21 specialties in engineering, 5 specialties in science and 6 specialties in science, for undergraduates to study.

Specialty
Arts
History
Education
Law
Engineering
Science
Management

Sites
In addition, CIT established many construction sites.

Schools
School of Humanities 
School of Mechanical Engineering
School of Computer Science and Engineering
School of Electrical Engineering and Automation
School of Management
School of Biology and Food Engineering
School of Mathematics and Statistics
School of Arts and Garments Engineering
School of Foreign Languages
School of Chemistry and Materials Engineering
School of Physics and Electronic Engineering
School of Marxism Studies
Continuing Education School
College of Teacher Education
Department of Physical Education

Library
The library consists of the Shaw Library in the East Lake campus and the Southeast campus library. 
It has five floors. The whole building combines the style of traditional Chinese architecture with Western construction. It also contains the Taoists water culture and Confucian mountain culture. In 2009, it came first in the evaluation of the university construction projects by the Shaw Foundation. The Southeast campus library is also located on Kuncheng Lake, across the Shaw Library.
The two libraries have 12 books reading rooms. They are stored with more than 1.2 million paper literature books, 3 million electronic books, 30,000 kinds of electronic journals and 1958 annual newspapers and periodicals.
The library has a staff of 60 people. Two of them have doctor's degree, three people have master's degree and 38 people have bachelor's degree. An organized and potential team with reasonable structures is being formed. With "reader first, service first" as its tenet, the library provides the open-shelf service and each reading room is equipped with reading seats and digital information resource retrieval point.
The opening time is from 8:15 to 21:30 every day. It also arranges certain opening time during holidays. The library provides multi-level and full range of information services, such as preengagement of books, document delivery, SDI service.
It also establishes good cooperation with some related literature institutions to share resources. All the work execute computer integrated management and realize the automation to provide a strong guarantee of literature information service. The library organizes the "Scholarly Campus" reading month activity every year and it was thought highly of in Suzhou.

Friendship colleges
University of San Francisco
Belarusian State Academy of Arts
University of Ulsan
Diploma Fachhochschule Nordhessen
Tatung University
It concentrates on the international communication and cooperation. The school also tries to enlarge the degree of internationalization. It has sent experts and professors to many countries, such as the United States, the United Kingdom, Japan, to engage in advanced studies. CIT attaches importance to the connection of local economy and education, and it wins a high social reputation. CIT also receives several foreign guests to further international communication. CIT has established cooperative relationships with many institutions of foreign countries. CIT attaches great importance to the local connection. Since reforming and opening, it strengthens academic exchanges with the outside world and dispatches experts to the United States, the United Kingdom, Germany, Japan, Singapore, Australia, Israel, India and other countries.

CIT cooperates with the Winchester School of Art at the University of Southampton and starts a project called" 2+2" talent training. It also cooperates with the German north Hessian Applied Technology University on the implementation of mechanical and electronic engineering and starts a plan called "3+1" talent training. After joining the "1 + 2 + 1" personnel training plan, CIT signed a cooperative education agreement with six American universities.
The Changshu Institute of Technology and the FOM University of Applied Sciences for Economics and Management signed MSc Economics Cooperation Agreement. It used "1+1" model and projects in three directions, including accounting and finance, marketing, marketing and communication. All courses conform to UNESCO standards; students completing the course will be awarded the Master of Arts recognized by German government and all other government around the world.

Faculty
The school promotes scientific research and subject construction by strengthening the teacher team. It has more than 1100 staffs now, including 600 doctors and masters. The school has established a scientific team. It devotes to scientific research and has achieved many scientific payoffs. It obtains 33 patents authorized by government and also takes nearly 100 transverse subjects. CIT teachers have published 57 monographs and 3,800 papers over the past five years. Around 600 published papers were included in SCI (Science Citation Index), EI (Engineering Index), CPCI (Conference Proceedings Citation Index) retrieval papers. Currently CIT teachers are taking charge of more than 500 research projects at national, provincial or city levels, such as the National Natural Science Fund and Agriculture Technology. CIT employs more than 50 foreign teachers (from the United States, Canada, the United Kingdom, France, Japan, Denmark, Finland) and holds the reception of foreign visitors to promote international academic exchanges.

School-running concept

The school stick to centring on school teaching and basic development. It also contribute to reform the training mode and improve the teaching quality. CIT takes the responsibility of two national teaching reform projects and twenty provincial teaching reform projects. It won the first or second prizes in six provincial teaching achievements. The school has always attached importance to the construction of the school spirit and the style of study. It also pays great attention to the education quality and standardizes the educational management work. CIT is listed as the university spirit construction standard units. It has been rewarded as Jiang Su Civilized School since 1997 and in 2009, it was rewarded as Suzhou Harmony School. It has made agreements on the cooperation of running schools with 6 colleges in America. CIT is inclined to develop to a high quality school with distinguishing features.
CIT adheres to develop with the local and regional economy. At the same time, the school attaches great importance to the international cooperation and accelerates the internationalization degree. Since reforming and opening, the school has sent several experts, scholars to the United States, the United Kingdom, Japan, Singapore, Australia, Israel, India and other countries for training.
In June 2007, CIT held the first party congress and put forward clearly to carry out the strategy of building a "quality, characteristic, talent, open and prospering" school. It devotes to the connotation construction and school transformation. The school also focuses on promoting harmonious campus construction and creating a distinctive characteristics university brand.

Financial aid
CIT pays great attention to assist the poor students and forms a complete system. It opens up "the green channel" for particularly poor students and also provides students loans. At the same time, CIT offers some part-time jobs in college. It sets nearly 20 different kinds of scholarships with some famous enterprises, such as Zhongchen, Changfang and Sharp Corporation. The scholarships range from 1,000 to 4,000 RMB. Besides, CIT also set freshman scholarship for new students and the reward is up to 10,000 RMB.
On 11 November, the Changshu Institute of Technology, together with the Changshu Human Resources and Social Security Administration, establishes the "Changshu University Employment Guidance Station". It will offer the introduction of employment policy, entrepreneurship training and employment services.

Employment of students
The high quality of students meets the requirement of the provincial economy and social development. The employment rate is around 95%. It also sets up the Students Career Center About two-thirds graduates work in Shanghai or Suzhou and most of them are thought highly of by the enterprises and opens employment guidance courses every year to help graduates to find suitable jobs. CIT invites distinguished entrepreneurs to make speeches on employment and answer questions of graduates. In 2006, the college built a strategic partnership of co-ordination with the United States Xinda energy equipment limited company (in Changshu). The company becomes a base of employment practice and holds job fairs periodically.
In order to Improve the comprehensive quality, CIT held "flea market" and" food street" and many students took part in it. The Student Council donated the income to the 2010 Yushu earthquake area.

Leadership
Professor Xu Ting, Secretary of CIT Party Committee
Professor FU Dayou, President of CIT
Professor Liu Huamin, Deputy Secretary of CIT Party Committee
Professor Zhu Shizhong, Vice President of CIT
Professor Zhu Linshen, Vice President of CIT
Professor Chen Jianhua, Vice President of CIT
Professor Ding Xiaoyuan, Vice President of CIT
Professor Shen Zonggen, Vice President of CIT
Professor Dai Guohong, Vice President of CIT.

Environment

CIT provides a good environment for students. It also focuses on the environmental protection. On 12 August 2010, the Changshu Institute of Technology carried out "low carbon life, to create a model city in environmental protection". Students carried out activities to raise national attention in environmental protection. They introduced the low carbon life knowledge and gave out more than 1,000 materials. It appealed to people to participate in creating the national environmental protection model city.

References

1958 establishments in China
Educational institutions established in 1958
Technical universities and colleges in China
Universities and colleges in Suzhou